Lincoln Square on the North Side of Chicago, Illinois, is one of the city's 77 community areas. It encompasses the smaller neighborhoods of Ravenswood, Ravenswood Gardens, Bowmanville, Budlong Woods as well as Lincoln Square itself.

Profile

In the 1840s, farming was begun in this area by newly arrived German Americans. Two brothers, Lyman and Joseph Budlong arrived in 1857 to start a commercial pickling operation near what is today Lincoln Avenue and Berwyn. They later opened a commercial green house and flower fields to provide flowers for the then new Rosehill Cemetery. In 1925, to honor Abraham Lincoln, the Chicago City Council named the area Lincoln Square, and a prominent statue of the namesake was erected in 1956.

About 44,000 people live in the neighborhood along with over 1,000 small and medium-sized businesses. It is accessible through the Brown Line of the 'L'. The neighborhood is bounded by Bryn Mawr and Peterson Avenues on the north, Montrose Avenue on the south, Ravenswood Avenue on the east and the Chicago River on the west. Its housing stock consists of private residences and small apartment buildings.

The commercial heart of Lincoln Square is located at the intersection of Lawrence, Western and Lincoln Avenues. Lincoln Avenue southeast of this intersection is home to a wide variety of restaurants and shops. Lincoln Square is historically known as a heavily German influenced and populated neighborhood, but now one is just as likely to see shops catering to the Thai culture. Still, the neighborhood is home to a number of German businesses, including Merz Apothecary and Lutz Café & Bakery, and is the home of the Chicago branches of DANK (the German American National Congress) and the Niedersachsen Club. The German-language weekly newspaper  was born in Lincoln Square in 1972, though its original headquarters above the Brauhaus is now only a bureau.

Events such as festivals and live musical performances are frequently held in Lincoln Square. The Apple Fest is a longstanding tradition in Lincoln Square that brings the community together to celebrate the beginning of fall. Dozens of vendors participate in the event each year selling autumn-themed crafts and apple-themed treats, such as fresh baked apple pies, bushels of apples, hot apple cider and apple pizza. The Square Roots Festival, which is held every summer, celebrates Lincoln Square's history in music and German culture with live performances from local musicians and craft beer from local breweries.

Neighborhoods
 Bowmanville
Bowmanville Woods
Bowmanville Gardens
Budlong
 Budlong Woods
Budlong Gardens
 Lincoln Square
 Lincoln Square North
Lincoln Square East
Lincoln Square South
Lincoln Square West
 Ravenswood
 Ravenswood Gardens

Politics 
Lincoln Square is a stronghold for the Democratic Party in elections. In the 2016 presidential election, Lincoln Square cast 15,317 votes for Hillary Clinton and cast 1,981 votes Donald Trump. In the 2012 presidential election, Lincoln Square cast 13,515 votes for Barack Obama and 2,435 votes for Mitt Romney. In the Illinois General Assembly, the entirety of Lincoln Square is located in the 7th Legislative District and the 13th House District. During the 101st General Assembly, the community area is represented by Senator Heather Steans and House Majority Leader Greg Harris. The Lincoln Square neighborhood encompasses the 40th and 47th wards on the Chicago City Council. The aldermen are Andre Vasquez in the 40th Ward and Matt Martin in the 47th Ward. Both were first elected in the 2019 election.

Points of interest 
 Conrad Sulzer Regional Library
 Cambodian Association of Illinois
 DANK Haus German American Cultural Center
 Old Town School of Folk Music
 Rosehill Cemetery

Hospitals 
 Kindred Hospital Chicago North
 Swedish Hospital

Schools 
Chicago Public Schools operates public schools. Many of these schools have benefited from GROW47, an initiative started by Alderman Ameya Pawar, which aims to improve funding for local public schools.

Amundsen High School is the designated CPS high school for most of the community area, while a small section is zoned to Mather High School.

Other private or parochial schools:
 Adler Schools
 Lycée Français de Chicago/The French International School
 North Park Elementary School
 North Shore Junior Academy
 Pilgrim Lutheran
 Queen of Angels Elementary School
 St. Hilary's Elementary School
 St. Mathias School
 Waldorf School

Parks
Lincoln Square contains several parks, which are maintained by the Chicago Park District.
 Winnemac Park covers more than 40 acres at the corner of Damen and Foster. The park contains the campuses of Amundsen High School, Chappell Elementary, and the Jorndt Field athletic complex. The park features natural prairie plants, multiple baseball fields, a soccer field, and a playground. The high school also includes a swimming pool, run by the Chicago Park District, that is open to the public during limited times.
 Welles Park covers 15 acres and sits at the corner of Lincoln and Montrose Avenues, across from the Conrad Sulzer Regional Library. It contains a community center, including a pool, gym, and fitness center. A gazebo stands at the center of the park where concerts are held during the summer. The playground in the northwest corner has swings, climbing equipment and a small splash-pad. There are also several baseball fields, tennis courts and courts to play horseshoes. The park recently won a grant to install a nature area in the southwest corner of the park. 
 Jacob Park is a small playlot located at Virginia and Leland Avenues, right next to the Chicago River. It features a large sandbox, which neighbors have stocked with trucks and toys. The Chicago "L" runs along the southern edge of the park, to the delight of children and adults.
 River Park is located along the Chicago River, south of Foster Ave. and west of Francisco Ave. The park includes a community center, an outdoor pool, and a popular splash pad. The park is also the start of the North Shore Channel Trail, which continues 6.7 miles through the Skokie Northshore Sculpture Park and up to Evanston's Ladd Arboretum.
 Vogle Playlot is tucked in the corner of Lawrence and Hoyne Avenues. It contains a newly renovated playground and swing-set.
 Gross Park is a small park located at the corner of Lawrence and Washtenaw, near the HarvesTime grocery store. It contains several basketball courts, a small soccer field, and an ADA-accessible soft-surface playground.
 Sunken Gardens Park is a small park that sits along the Chicago River at the corner of Virginia and Sunnyside Avenues. It contains a small grassy space and a few benches.

Local businesses
 Amy's Candy Bar
 Blackbird Gallery and Framing
 The Book Cellar
 Budacki's Drive In
 Caravan Guitars
 The Chicago Mosaic School
 The Chopping Block
 Davis Theater
 Café Selmarie
 Degerberg Academy of Martial Arts
 Enjoy, An Urban General Store
 Gideon Welles
 Heather Parker Photography
 Lincoln Square Athletic Club
 Merz Apothecary
 Rockwell's Neighborhood Grill
 Savory Spice Shop
 Stanley Brown Jewelist
 Timeless Toys

Public art
 Berlin Wall Monument (Western Avenue Brown Line Station), 2008
 Lincoln/Leland Mural (Lincoln Quality Meat Market), 2007
 Greater Rockwell Mural (Beans and Bagels), 2005
 Lincoln/Sunnyside Mural, 1997
 The Maypole (Leland and Lincoln), 1999
 Giddings Square Fountain, 1999
 Lombard Lamp (Giddings Square), 1979
 The Chicago Lincoln statue (Corner of Western, Lawrence and Lincoln), 1956
 The Lincoln Square Mural (Lincoln Square Athletic Club), 1991

Events 
The following events occur within the neighborhood on an annual basis.
 Ravenswood Run 5K
 May Fest
 Lincoln Square Summer Concert Series
 Square Roots
 Lincoln Square Poetry Fest
 German-American Fest
 Lincoln Square Fall Apple Fest
 Friends of the Craft Beer Festival
 Friends of the Grape Wine Festival
 Christmas Tree Lighting in the Square

Notable people
 Russell A. Berg (1917–2002), brigadier general in the United States Air Force. He resided at 4624 North Winchester Avenue for a time in the 1940s.
 George Papadopoulos (born 1987), former advisor to the 2016 presidential campaign of Donald Trump. He was living in Lincoln Square at the time of his arrest.
 Mike Simmons (born 1983), member of the Illinois Senate since 2019. His family was one of the first Black families to integrate Lincoln Square after the United States Supreme Court mandated that public housing be built on the city’s North Side.
 Nicholas Zagone (1931–2020), member of the Illinois House of Representatives from 1959 to 1965. He was raised in Lincoln Square.

Bordering community areas 
 Uptown
 Edgewater
 North Park
 Albany Park
 North Center
 West Ridge

References

External links

 Official City of Chicago Lincoln Square Community Map
Lincoln Square Chamber of Commerce

Community areas of Chicago
North Side, Chicago